is a passenger railway station located in the Takebe-chō neighborhood of Kita-ku of the city of Okayama, Okayama Prefecture, Japan. It is operated by West Japan Railway Company (JR West).

Lines

Station layout
The station consists of two ground-level opposed side platforms connected by a level crossing. There used to be a large wooden station building built at the time of its opening, which was relatively well maintained, but the station office was demolished and the waiting room was rebuilt to about half the size. The station is unattended.

Platforms

Adjacent stations

History
The station opened on 21 December 1898. With the privatization of Japanese National Railways (JNR) on 1 April 1987, the station came under the control of JR West.

Passenger statistics
In fiscal 2019, the station was used by an average of 98 passengers daily..

Surrounding area
Asahi River
Okayama Prefectural Road No. 27 Okayama Yoshii Line
Okayama Prefectural Road No. 218 Tamahashi Nonokuchi Line
Okayama Prison

See also
List of railway stations in Japan

References

External links

 Tamagashi Station Official Site

Railway stations in Okayama
Tsuyama Line
Railway stations in Japan opened in 1898